Beringovsky District was an administrative district (raion) of Chukotka Autonomous Okrug, Russia, which existed in 1957–2011. As a municipal division, it was, together with Anadyrsky Administrative District, incorporated as Anadyrsky Municipal District. It was located on the southeastern shores of the autonomous okrug and bordered with Anadyrsky District in the west and the Bering Sea in the east. Its administrative center was the urban locality (an urban-type settlement) of Beringovsky.

Geography
The district was the smallest in area of all districts within Chukotka Autonomous Okrug. It was a particularly mountainous region, part of the Koryak Highlands, and was a center for glaciation within the okrug. As a result of this, and due to the fact that a significant proportion of the less rugged land in the interior of the district was used for reindeer pasture, the administrative center of Beringovsky and three other native villages in the district were all situated on the coast of the Bering Sea. As the sea in this area rarely, if ever, freezes, it was the main transport route between settlements, especially considering that the road network within the district was almost non-existent. The other rural locality in the district, Alkatvaam, was not connected by road to any other populated places and despite its proximity to Beringovsky all transport was done by sea or a helicopter.

Economy

As with much of Chukotka, mining for coal and minerals was the main driver of the economy, leaving agriculture and other forms of commerce underdeveloped by all except indigenous peoples. The Nagornaya Mine JSC was the largest mining company in the district and extracted nearly 300,000 tons of coal during 2005. Other industries included the Federal State Enterprise, Bering Sea Port, which is one of the main cargo processing center in the autonomous okrug after Anadyr and Pevek, and the Bering Beer and Beverage Plant, although it filed for bankruptcy.

Although medium to heavy industry dominated the district, and traditional economic drivers remained underdeveloped, the high percentage of indigenous Chukchi (around 40%) allowed three farms, centered around three separate rural localities, to carry on traditional reindeer farming and husbandry as well as farming a variety of other traditional animals.

Status changes
Before May 2008, Beringovsky Administrative District was municipally incorporated as Beringovsky Municipal District. In May 2008, Anadyrsky and Beringovsky Municipal Districts were merged, forming an enlarged Tsentralny Municipal District. This change, however, did not affect the administrative aspect of these districts. Both Anadyrsky and Beringovsky Administrative Districts continued to exist separately. In October 2008, the law mandating the change was amended and the name Tsentralny was discarded with the combined municipal district being renamed Anadyrsky Municipal District.

Beringovsky Administrative District was itself merged into Anadyrsky Administrative District effective June 13, 2011.

Divisions

Administrative divisions
Beringovsky Administrative District had administrative jurisdiction over one urban-type settlement (Beringovsky) and three rural localities: Alkatvaam, Khatyrka, and Meynypilgyno.

Municipal divisions
Beringovsky Municipal District was abolished in 2008, and all of the municipal formations previously within the district became a part of Anadyrsky Municipal District.

References

Notes

Sources

Petit Fute, Chukotka

Districts of Chukotka Autonomous Okrug
1957 establishments in the Soviet Union